The North American Membrane Society (NAMS) is a scientific society based in the United States which promotes inquiry in the field of membrane science. NAMS is a 501(c)3 non-profit organization. It holds an annual national meeting featuring seminars by prominent membrane scientists, engineers, and industry professionals. NAMS also provides support to membrane scientists and students through its awards program, in the form of fellowships and travel awards.

Meetings
NAMS hosts national meetings in rotating locations in the United States. The 26th National Meeting was held in 2016 in Seattle, Washington.

Membrane Quarterly
NAMS publishes Membrane Quarterly, a publication edited at the University of Arkansas which showcases news and research in the field of membrane science.

See also
 Membrane
 Polymer Chemistry

References

External links
 NAMS website

Scientific societies based in the United States
Organizations established in 1985
1985 establishments in the United States